Edward Sharpe and the Magnetic Zeros is the third album by Edward Sharpe and the Magnetic Zeros. It was released on July 23, 2013 in North America and was released on July 29, 2013 around the world through Vagrant Records, Rough Trade Records and Communion Records. Frontman Alex Ebert stated that "These songs mean everything to me - It's the rawest, most liberated, most rambunctious stuff we've done."

On May 22, 2013, Edward Sharpe and the Magnetic Zeros posted "Better Days", the first single from the upcoming album on their Soundcloud and Tumblr pages.

On July 15, 2013, the band made the whole album available for streaming online through NPR.

The band uploaded a music video for their second single, "Life Is Hard", on their YouTube channel on September 19, 2013. The music video, filmed in The Box Theatre in New York, was performed in front of a live audience on August 25, 2013.

Track listing

Personnel
Alex Ebert – vocals, acoustic guitar, electric guitar, percussion, string arrangements, keyboards, electric bass, basketball, melodica
Jade Castrinos – vocals, acoustic guitar, tambourine
Christian Letts – electric and acoustic guitar, 12 string guitar, mandolin, marching bass drum, vocals
Stewart Cole – trumpet, synths, piano, alto horn, flugelhorn, baritone horn, cornet, hammond and lowrey organs, Wurlitzer, clavinet, pump organ, recorder, vocals
Mark Noseworthy – electric and acoustic guitar, 11 string guitar, ronrocco, tenor banjo, slide guitar, electric 12-string guitar, mandolin, vocals
Crash – vocals
Orpheo McCord – percussion, drums, marimba, vocals
Nora Kirkpatrick – accordion, organ, keys, omnichord, vocals
Josh Collazo – drums, concert toms, percussion, alto saxophone, vocals
Seth Ford-Young – electric bass, upright bass, vocals

With:
Aaron Arntz – piano on "Better Days" and "If I Were Free"
Nico Algietti – electric guitar on "Remember to Remember", "Please", acoustic on "Life Is Hard"
Roger Joseph Manning Jr. – piano on "Life Is Hard"
Aaron Embry – piano and organ solo on "This Life"
Nathaniel Markman – violin on "They Were Wrong" and "Remember to Remember"
Fred Bows and Susie Park – violins on "Two", "Life Is Hard", and "In the Lion"
Matt Linesch – engineer/mixer

Reception

On Metacritic, which assigns a rating out of 100 to reviews from mainstream critics, Edward Sharpe and the Magnetic Zeros holds an average score of 61, based on 21 reviews, indicating "generally favorable reviews".

The album debuted at No. 14 on the Billboard 200, and No. 1 on the Folk Albums chart, selling around 18,000 copies in its first week. It has sold 60,000 copies as of March 2016.

Charts

References

External links
 Announcement of album
 Summer tour

2013 albums
Edward Sharpe and the Magnetic Zeros albums
Rough Trade Records albums
Vagrant Records albums
Albums recorded at Studio in the Country